Kamallı (also, Kemally, Kayamally, and Kyamally) is a village and municipality in the Saatly Rayon of Azerbaijan.  It has a population of 1,051.

References 

Populated places in Saatly District